Hashima may refer to:

Hashima, Gifu (羽島市), city in Gifu Prefecture, Japan
 The Hashima meteorite of circa 1910, which landed in Hashima City (see meteorite falls)
Hashima District, Gifu (羽島郡), a nearby district in Gifu Prefecture, Japan
Hashima Island (端島) (nicknamed Gunkanjima, which translates to "Battleship Island"), an uninhabited island in Nagasaki Prefecture, Japan, formerly home to a coal mining facility
Hasma, also known as Hashima, frog glands popular in Asia